4-Bromo-3,5-dimethoxyamphetamine is a lesser-known psychedelic drug and a substituted amphetamine. It was first synthesized by Alexander Shulgin. In his book PiHKAL, the dosage range is listed as 4–10 mg and the duration is listed as 8–12 hours. It produces analgesia, numbness, and reduction of physical feeling.  Very little data exists about its pharmacological properties, metabolism, and toxicity.

See also 
 Phenethylamine
 Psychedelics, dissociatives and deliriants

References

Substituted amphetamines
Bromoarenes
Resorcinol ethers